Tsuyoshi Tanaka, Ph.D., is a Japanese chemist, who is active in the fields of nanotechnology and environmental science; he is a professor of the Tokyo University of Agriculture and Technology (TUAT).

Works 
 Biological Magnetic Materials and Applications / eds. Tadashi Matsunaga, Tsuyoshi Tanaka, David Kisailus, Springer, 2018, 260 p. , .

References

Literature 
 Vargas, G.; Cypriano, J.; Correa, T.; Leão, P.; Bazylinski, D.A.; Abreu, F. Applications of Magnetotactic Bacteria, Magnetosomes and Magnetosome Crystals in Biotechnology and Nanotechnology: Mini-Review. Molecules 2018, 23, 2438; doi:10.3390/molecules23102438.
 Osaka, T., Matsunaga, T., Nakanishi, T. et al. Anal Bioanal Chem (2006) 384: 593; doi:10.1007/s00216-005-0255-7.

Web-sources 
 
 

Living people
Year of birth missing (living people)
Japanese chemists
Academic staff of Tokyo University of Agriculture and Technology